For the People is a political party in Slovakia founded by former President Andrej Kiska in 2019. Kiska became party's leader on founding convention on 28 September 2019. Deputy Prime Minister and Investments, Regional Development and Informatisation Minister Veronika Remišová became the new chair of the party on 8 August 2020, having been elected by delegates at the party congress held in Trenčianske Teplice, defeating her rival candidate, MP and Hlohovec mayor Miroslav Kollár.

Election results

National Council

History of leaders

See also
 :Category:For the People (Slovakia) politicians
 Politics of Slovakia
 List of political parties in Slovakia

Footnotes

External links
Official website

2019 establishments in Slovakia
Conservative liberal parties
Liberal conservative parties in Slovakia
Liberal parties in Slovakia
Political parties established in 2019
Pro-European political parties in Slovakia